Aleksandar "Sascha" Bajin (born 4 October 1984) is a German tennis coach and former player of Serbian origin.

Biography
He is best known as the former hitting partner of Serena Williams when she won several of her major title wins; and for coaching Naomi Osaka to two Grand Slam titles, one at the 2018 US Open and one at the 2019 Australian Open. He won the inaugural WTA Coach of the Year award in 2018 for coaching Osaka to her first two titles, the US Open and the Indian Wells Open. Osaka split with Bajin shortly after her Australian Open title.

In April 2019, he began working with Kristina Mladenovic. He split with Mladenovic in October 2019 and started coaching Dayana Yastremska. In September 2020 they split after Yastremska had a disappointing performance in the 2020 US Open.

From November 2020 to July 2022, Bajin coached Karolína Plíšková. She reached the 2021 Wimbledon Championships final under his tutelage. The two reunited in December 2022 for the 2023 season.

Bajin had previously served as a hitting partner for Serena Williams for eight years, and then was a hitting partner for Victoria Azarenka, Sloane Stephens, and Caroline Wozniacki. Bajin had a brief career on the Association of Tennis Professionals (ATP) Tour, reaching career high rankings of 1149 in singles and 1180 in doubles.

References

External links
 
 
 Sascha Bajin at the Women's Tennis Association

1984 births
Living people
German tennis coaches
German male tennis players
German people of Serbian descent